John Harwood may refer to:

John Harwood (watchmaker) (1893–1965), English watchmaker who developed first self-winding watch
John Harwood (biochemist) (born 1946), British biochemist
John Harwood (writer) (born 1946), Australian novelist
John Harwood (journalist) (born 1956), American journalist
John Berwick Harwood (1828–1899), English writer